The following Diagram is provided as an overview of and topical guide to the human nervous system:

Human nervous system – the part of the human body that coordinates a person's voluntary and involuntary actions and transmits signals between different parts of the body. The human nervous system consists of two main parts: the central nervous system (CNS) and the peripheral nervous system (PNS). The CNS contains the brain and spinal cord. The PNS consists mainly of nerves, which are long fibers that connect the CNS to every other part of the body. The PNS includes motor neurons, mediating voluntary movement; the autonomic nervous system, comprising the sympathetic nervous system and the parasympathetic nervous system and regulating involuntary functions; and the enteric nervous system, a semi-independent part of the nervous system whose function is to control the gastrointestinal system.

Evolution of the human nervous system 

 Evolution of nervous systems
 Evolution of human intelligence
 Evolution of the human brain
 Paleoneurology

Some branches of science that study the human nervous system 
 Neuroscience
 Neurology
 Paleoneurology

Central nervous system
The central nervous system (CNS) is the largest part of the nervous system and includes the brain and spinal cord.

Spinal cord

Brain
Brain – center of the nervous system.
Outline of the human brain
List of regions of the human brain

Principal regions of the vertebrate brain:

Peripheral nervous system
Peripheral nervous system (PNS) – nervous system structures that do not lie within the CNS.

Sensory system
A sensory system is a part of the nervous system responsible for processing sensory information. A sensory system consists of sensory receptors, neural pathways, and parts of the brain involved in sensory perception.

List of sensory systems
Sensory neuron
Perception
Visual system
Auditory system
Somatosensory system
Vestibular system
Olfactory system
Taste
Pain

Components of the nervous system 
Neuron
Interneuron
Ganglion (PNS) vs Nucleus (neuroanatomy) (CNS) except basal ganglia (CNS)
Nerve(PNS) vs Tract (neuroanatomy) (CNS)
White matter (more myelinated) vs Grey matter

Glial cells
Glial cells, commonly called neuroglia or glia, are supportive cells that maintain homeostasis, form myelin, and provide support and protection for the brain's neurons.

Microglia
Astrocyte
Oligodendrocyte (CNS) vs Schwann cell (PNS)

Neuron

A neuron (also known as a neurone or nerve cell) is an excitable cell in the nervous system that processes and transmits information by electrochemical signaling. Neurons are the core components of the brain, spinal cord, and peripheral nerves.

Soma
Axon
Myelin
Dendrite
Dendritic spine

Action potential
An action potential (or nerve impulse) is a transient alteration of the transmembrane voltage (or membrane potential) across the membrane in an excitable cell generated by the activity of voltage-gated ion channels embedded in the membrane. The best known action potentials are pulse-like waves that travel along the axons of neurons.

Membrane potential
Ion channel
 Voltage-gated ion channels

Synapse

Synapses are specialized junctions through which neurons signal to each other and to non-neuronal cells such as those in muscles or glands.

Chemical synapse
Gap junction
Synaptic plasticity
Long-term potentiation

Neurotransmitter
Neurotransmitter – endogenous chemical that relays, amplifies, and modulates signals between neurons and other cells to which they are synaptically connected.

List of neurotransmitters
Neuromodulator
Monoamine neurotransmitter
Neuropeptide

Neurotransmitter receptor
Neurotransmitter receptor – membrane receptor that can be activated by a neurotransmitter.  Interactions between neurotransmitters and neurotransmitter receptors can evoke a wide range of differing responses from the cell receiving the signal, including excitation, inhibition, and various types of modulation.

:Category:Receptors

Biological neural network
Biological neural network – population of physically interconnected neurons that act cooperatively to form a functional circuit.  Computer scientists and engineers also study artificial neural networks formed by simplified mathematical abstractions of the signaling properties of biological neurons.

Central pattern generator
Reflex arc
Neural oscillations
Neural network

Neural development
Neural development – comprises the processes that generate, shape, and reshape the nervous system, from the earliest stages of embryogenesis to the final years of life.

Neural plasticity
Neurogenesis
Neuroregeneration

Prenatal development of the nervous system

Neurogenesis 
 General neural development
 Neurulation
 Neurula
 Notochord
 Neuroectoderm
 Neural plate 
 Neural fold
 Neural groove
 Neuropoiesis
 Neural crest 
 Cranial neural crest 
 Cardiac neural crest complex
 Truncal neural crest
 Neural tube
 Rostral neuropore
 Neuromere/Rhombomere
 Cephalic flexure
 Pontine flexure
 Alar plate 
 sensory
 Basal plate 
 motor
 Glioblast
 Neuroblast
 Germinal matrix

Eye development 
Eye development
 Neural tube: Optic vesicle
 Optic stalk
 Optic cup
 Surface ectoderm: Lens placode

Auditory development 
 Otic placode 
 Otic pit
 Otic vesicle

Motor control
Motor control – comprises the activities carried out by the nervous system that organize the musculoskeletal system to create coordinated movements and skilled actions.

Motor system
Motor vortex
cerebrum
Basal ganglia
Reflex

Learning and memory
Memory – organism's ability to store, retain, and recall information. "Learning" means acquiring new knowledge, behaviors, skills, values, preferences or understanding, and may involve synthesizing different types of information.

Amnesia
Synaptic plasticity
Classical conditioning
Operant conditioning
Imprinting (psychology)

Cognition
Cognition – activities involved in processing information, applying knowledge, and changing preferences. Cognition, or cognitive processes, can be natural or artificial, conscious or unconscious.

Mind
Consciousness
Neural correlates of consciousness
Attention
Emotion
Intelligence
Decision-making
Executive function

Arousal
Arousal – physiological and psychological state of being awake or reactive to stimuli.

Sleep
Anesthesia
Coma
Reticular formation

Anatomical structures of the human nervous system by subsystem

Central nervous system 
Central nervous system
General terms
Meninges
Spinal cord
Gray columns
White substance
Brain
Brainstem
Cerebellum
Diencephalon
Telencephalon
Cerebral hemisphere

Peripheral nervous system 
Peripheral nervous system
General termsi
Cranial nerves
Olfactory nerve
Optic nerve
Oculomotor nerve
Trochlear nerve
Trigeminal nerve
Sensory root
Trigeminal ganglion
Ophthalmic nerve
Lacrimal nerve
Frontal nerve
Supra-orbital nerve
Supratrochlear nerve
Nasociliary nerve
Posterior ethmoidal nerve
Anterior ethmoidal nerve
External nasal nerve
Infratrochlear nerve
Maxillary nerve
Nasopalatine nerve
Pharyngeal nerve
Greater palatine nerve
Lesser palatine nerves
Superior alveolar nerves
Zygomatic nerve
Infra-orbital nerve
Mandibular nerve
Masseteric nerve
Deep temporal nerves
Buccal nerve
Auriculotemporal nerve
Lingual nerve
Chorda tympani
Sublingual nerve
Inferior alveolar nerve
Nerve to mylohyoid
Mental nerve
Abducent nerve
Facial nerve
Posterior auricular nerve
Intermediate nerve
Greater petrosal nerve
Chorda tympani (also in trigeminal?  redundancy?)
Vestibulocochlear nerve
Vestibular nerve
Cochlear nerve
Glossopharyngeal nerve
Tympanic nerve
Tympanic plexus
Lesser petrosal nerve
Vagus nerve
Superior laryngeal nerve
Recurrent laryngeal nerve
Accessory nerve
Hypoglossal nerve
Spinal nerves
Cervical nerves
Suboccipital nerve
Greater occipital nerve
Third occipital nerve
Cervical plexus
Ansa cervicalis
Lesser occipital nerve
Great auricular nerve
Transverse cervical nerve
Supraclavicular nerves
Phrenic nerve
Brachial plexus
Supraclavicular part
Dorsal scapular nerve
Long thoracic nerve
Subclavian nerve
Suprascapular nerve
Subscapular nerves
Lower subscapular nerve
Upper subscapular nerve
Thoracodorsal nerve
Medial pectoral nerve
Lateral pectoral nerve
Infraclavicular part
Musculocutaneous nerve
Medial cutaneous nerve of arm
Medial cutaneous nerve of forearm
Median nerve
Ulnar nerve
Radial nerve
Axillary nerve
Thoracic nerves
Lumbar nerves
Medial clunial nerves
Sacral nerves and coccygeal nerve
Lumbar plexus
Iliohypogastric nerve
Ilio-inguinal nerve
Anterior labial nerves
Anterior scrotal nerves
Genitofemoral nerve
Lateral cutaneous nerve of thigh
Obturator nerve
Accessory obturator nerve
Femoral nerve
Saphenous nerve
Medial cutaneous nerve of leg
Lumbosacral trunk
Sacral plexus
Nerve to obturator internus
Nerve to piriformis
Nerve to quadratus femoris
Superior gluteal nerve
Inferior gluteal nerve
Posterior cutaneous nerve of thigh
Inferior clunial nerves
Perforating cutaneous nerve
Pudendal nerve
Inferior anal nerves
Perineal nerves
Posterior labial nerves
Posterior scrotal nerves
Dorsal nerve of clitoris
Dorsal nerve of penis
Coccygeal nerve
Anococcygeal nerve
Sciatic nerve
Common fibular nerve
Lateral sural cutaneous nerve
Superficial fibular nerve
Deep fibular nerve
Tibial nerve
Interosseous nerve of leg
Medial sural cutaneous nerve
Sural nerve
Medial plantar nerve
Lateral plantar nerve
Autonomic division (Autonomic nervous system)
Sympathetic part
Sympathetic trunk
Rami communicantes
Superior cervical ganglion
Middle cervical ganglion
Cervicothoracic ganglion (Stellate - should prob. include inferior cerv. ganglion)
Thoracic ganglia
Greater splanchnic nerve
Lesser splanchnic nerve
Least splanchnic nerve
Lumbar ganglia
Lumbar splanchnic nerves
Sacral ganglia
Sacral splanchnic nerves
Ganglion impar
Parasympathetic part
Cranial part
Ciliary ganglion
Short ciliary nerves
Pterygopalatine ganglion
Nerve of pterygoid canal
Submandibular ganglion
Sublingual ganglion
Otic ganglion
Pelvic part
Pelvic ganglia
Parasympathetic root of pelvic ganglia = Pelvic splanchnic nerves
Peripheral autonomic plexuses and ganglia
Craniocervical part
Internal carotid plexus
Thoracic part
Cardiac plexus
Esophageal plexus
Pulmonary plexus
Abdominal part
Celiac plexus
Aorticorenal ganglia
Superior mesenteric plexus
Inferior mesenteric plexus
Pelvic part
Superior hypogastric plexus
Inferior hypogastric plexus

See also 
 List of regions in the human brain
 List of nerves of the human body
 Outline of human anatomy
 Outline of neuroscience

External links 

nervous system
nervous system
+nerv